Alexandra Dock was a station located on the Liverpool Overhead Railway, west of Regent Road (A565) and within the MDHC Dock Estate. The station was named after the adjacent Alexandra Dock.

The station was opened on the 6 March 1893 by the Marquis of Salisbury and was the northern terminus of the line until it was extended to Seaforth Sands just over a year later.

The station closed, along with the rest of the line, on 30 December 1956. No evidence of this station remains.

See also 
 Alexandra Dock railway station, LNWR surface station serving the same dock

References

Disused railway stations in the Metropolitan Borough of Sefton
Former Liverpool Overhead Railway stations
Railway stations in Great Britain opened in 1893
Railway stations in Great Britain closed in 1956